Clarkston  may refer to:

Places

United States
 Clarkston, Georgia
 Clarkston, Michigan
 Clarkston, Utah
 Clarkston, Washington
 Clarkston, Gallatin County, Montana

Scotland
 Clarkston, East Renfrewshire
 Clarkston, North Lanarkshire, an area of Airdrie

See also
 Clarkson (disambiguation)